Moson (German: Wieselburg, Slovak: Mošon) was an administrative county (comitatus) of the Kingdom of Hungary, situated mostly on the right (south) side of the Danube river. Its territory is now divided between Austria and Hungary, except a small area which is part of Slovakia. Moson is also the name of a town, nowadays part of the city Mosonmagyaróvár, Hungary.

Geography
Moson county shared borders with the Austrian land Lower Austria and the Hungarian counties Pozsony, Győr and Sopron. The river Danube runs along the north of the county, and the Lake Neusiedl (Hungarian: Fertő tó) lies partly in the county. Its area was 2013 km2 around 1910.

Capitals
The capital of the county was the town of Moson initially. The capital was moved to nearby Magyaróvár in the Middle Ages. Moson and Magyaróvár merged in 1939 to form the city of Mosonmagyaróvár.

History
The Moson comitatus arose as one of the first comitatuses of the Kingdom of Hungary.

In 1920 by the Treaty of Trianon a tiny part of Moson county close to Pressburg (Pozsony, today's Bratislava) became part of newly formed Czechoslovakia. The eastern part stayed in Hungary and merged with Győr county and a very small part of Pozsony county to form Győr-Moson-Pozsony county. The western part became part of the new Austrian land Burgenland (formed in 1921). Three villages – Dunacsún, (Čunovo), Horvátjárfalu (Jarovce), and Oroszvár (Rusovce) – became part of Czechoslovakia.

After World War II, Győr-Moson-Pozsony county merged with Sopron County to form Győr-Sopron county. This county was renamed to Győr-Moson-Sopron county in the early 1990s.

Demographics

1900
In 1900, the county had a population of 89,714 people and was composed of the following linguistic communities:

Total:

 German: 54,508 (60.7%)
 Hungarian: 25,991 (29.0%)
 Croatian: 8,017 (8.9%)
 Slovak: 589 (0.7%)
 Romanian: 21 (0.0%)
 Serbian: 3 (0.0%)
 Ruthenian: 1 (0.0%)
 Other or unknown: 584 (0.7%)

According to the census of 1900, the county was composed of the following religious communities:

Total:

 Roman Catholic: 77,934 (86.9%)
 Lutheran: 9,309 (10.4%)
 Jewish: 2,180 (2,4)
 Calvinist: 256 (0.3%)
 Greek Catholic: 19 (0.0%)
 Unitarian: 8 (0.0%)
 Greek Orthodox: 4 (0.0%)
 Other or unknown: 4 (0.0%)

1910

In 1910, the county had a population of 94,479 people and was composed of the following linguistic communities:

Total:

 German: 51,997 (55.0%)
 Hungarian: 33,006 (34.9%)
 Croatian: 8,123 (8.6%)
 Slovak: 735 (0.8%)
 Ruthenian: 7 (0.0%)
 Romanian: 5 (0.0%)
 Serbian: 2 (0.0%)
 Other or unknown: 604 (0.7%)

According to the census of 1910, the county was composed of the following religious communities:

Total:

 Roman Catholic: 82,636 (87.5%)
 Lutheran: 9,551 (10.1%)
 Jewish: 1,881 (2,0)
 Calvinist: 355 (0.4%)
 Greek Catholic: 37 (0.0%)
 Greek Orthodox: 12 (0.0%)
 Unitarian: 5 (0.0%)
 Other or unknown: 2 (0.0%)

Subdivisions

In the early 20th century, the subdivisions of Moson county were:

Neusiedl am See is now in Austria.

References

States and territories disestablished in 1920
Counties in the Kingdom of Hungary
Divided regions